
Białogard County is a unit of territorial administration and local government (powiat) in West Pomeranian Voivodeship, north-western Poland. It came into being on January 1, 1999, as a result of the Polish local government reforms passed in 1998.

As of 2006 its total population was 48,241, out of which the population of Białogard was 24,339, that of Karlino 5,794, and the rural population 18,108 (including approximately 2,500 for the population of Tychowo, which became a town in 2010).

Neighbouring counties
Białogard County is bordered by Koszalin County to the north, Szczecinek County to the south-east, Świdwin County to the south and Kołobrzeg County to the north-west.

Administrative division
The county is subdivided into four gminas (one urban, two urban-rural and one rural). These are listed in the following table, in descending order of population.

References
Polish official population figures 2006

 
Land counties of West Pomeranian Voivodeship